Zahidi is a cultivar of the palm date that originated in Iraq. It has light brown skin. It is a semi-dry date of medium size that is very sweet. Zahidi dates ship well and are widely exported.

It is the most widely grown date cultivar in Iraq, with about 6 million planted trees as of 2015. In Iraq, the average annual yield is 73 kg per tree, although yields can often exceed 100 kg. Other than Iraq, it is also grown in Djibouti, Chile, Peru, India, Iran, Israel, Palestine, and Syria.

Zahidi date palms are also highly valued for landscaping.

Etymology
Zahidi is the Arabic word for "ascetic." The name of the date cultivar may have also been derived from Zahidi in the Basra region of southern Iraq.

See also
List of date cultivars

References

Date cultivars
Agriculture in Iraq
Food and drink in Iraq